The 2012 Comerica Bank Challenger was a professional tennis tournament played on hard courts. It was the 24th edition of the tournament which was part of the 2012 ATP Challenger Tour. It took place in Aptos, California, United States between 6 and 12 August July 2012.

Singles main-draw entrants

Seeds

 1 Rankings are as of July 30, 2012.

Other entrants
The following players received wildcards into the singles main draw:
  Brian Baker
  Robby Ginepri
  Steve Johnson
  Bradley Klahn

The following players received entry from the qualifying draw:
  Ilija Bozoljac
  Jeff Dadamo
  Matt Reid
  Dmitry Tursunov

Champions

Singles

  Steve Johnson def.  Robert Farah, 6–3, 6–3

Doubles

  Rik de Voest /  John Peers def.  Chris Guccione /  Frank Moser, 6–7(5–7), 6–1, [10–4]

References
Official Website

External links
ITF Search
ATP official site

Comerica Bank Challenger
Nordic Naturals Challenger
Com